Darvin Jesus Castro Palma (born 1995) is a Venezuelan weightlifter. He is a two-time silver medalist at the Pan American Weightlifting Championships (2021 and 2022). He is also a two-time gold medalist at the 2022 Bolivarian Games held in Valledupar, Colombia.

Career 

In 2017, he won two bronze medals at the Bolivarian Games held in Santa Marta, Colombia.

He won the silver medal in the men's 81kg event at the 2022 Pan American Weightlifting Championships held in Bogotá, Colombia. He also won the silver medal in this event at the 2021 Pan American Weightlifting Championships held in Guayaquil, Ecuador.

He won two gold medals at the 2022 Bolivarian Games held in Valledupar, Colombia. He won the bronze medal in the men's 81kg event at the 2022 South American Games held in Asunción, Paraguay. He competed in the men's 81kg event at the 2022 World Weightlifting Championships in Bogotá, Colombia.

Achievements

References

External links 
 

Living people
1995 births
Venezuelan male weightlifters
Pan American Weightlifting Championships medalists
South American Games bronze medalists for Venezuela
South American Games medalists in weightlifting
Competitors at the 2022 South American Games
21st-century Venezuelan people